Mohamed El-Monir Abdessalam (born 8 April 1992), also known as Mohamed El Monir, is a Libyan footballer who plays for Libyan Premier League club Al-Ahli Tripoli and the Libya national team.

Club career

Al-Ittihad Tripoli
El Monir came through the youth ranks of Al-Ittihad Tripoli and was promoted to the first team in the 2010–11 Libyan Premier League season. Al-Ittihad with El Monir were top of the league, undefeated after 15 rounds, with 13 victories and just two draws, when the league was abandoned half-way due to the Libyan Civil War.

Jagodina

2011–12 season
El Monir signed with Serbian side Jagodina in summer 2011 coming from Al-Ittihad Tripoli. He made his debut for FK Jagodina on 26 October 2011 as a starter in a last 16-round match of Serbian Cup against FK Javor Ivanjica, a 3–5 penalty loss after a 1–1 draw after extra-time. His league debut happened on 17 March 2012, in a round 19 match against current league leaders and previous season champions, Partizan.

2012–13 season
On 21 April 2012, he impressed the local media and specially the club supporters when he showed extreme will of playing and a die-hard attitude when he played 35 minutes of the 23rd round of the SuperLiga match against FK BSK Borča with a fractured foot. It all happened in the 10th minute, however El Monir willing to keep on playing only reported the injury at the half-time and got substituted. As this was only the second time that he got a chance to be a starter in the team he did not wanted to miss the chance to show his skills, and despite the pain, he did his best to contribute to keep on playing. Despite the questionable attitude from the point of view of his health, the national press and Jagodina officials and supporters couldn't resist not to praise this display of enormous dedication.

In early October 2012, prior to his departure to join the national team, El Monir renewed his contract with Jagodina until 2015. On 8 May 2013, he played a key role in Jagodina's 1–0 victory against FK Vojvodina in the 2013 Serbian Cup Final.

2013–14 season
At the beginning of the 2013–14 season, El Monir played against Rubin Kazan in the 2013–14 UEFA Europa League qualifying phase and play-off round. On 4 November 2013, it was announced that CA Osasuna sent scouts to watch El Monir play for Jagodina.

Return to Al-Ittihad Tripoli
During the winter break, he left Jagodina and returned to Libya and played for his former club Al-Ittihad Tripoli.

Return to Jagodina
On 28 August 2014, he signed again with Jagodina. During the first part of 2014–15 season, he has not played a single game. In December 2014, El Monir went on trial at Genk in Belgium.

Dinamo Minsk
On 30 April 2015, El Monir signed a contract with Dinamo Minsk. He made his debut for Dinamo in Vysheyshaya Liga on 31 May 2015, playing the full 90 minutes in a 2–1 home win over Naftan. During his first season in Belarus, he has played 11 league games. On 1 October 2015, El Monir made his debut in UEFA Europa League group stage against Rapid Wien as a substitute in the 66th minute. On 5 November, El Monir was the first time in the starting lineup in Europa League, in a 1–2 home defeat against Villarreal. On 10 December, he entered in the game in 65th minute of the match against Rapid Wien and scored a goal one minute later in 2–1 away loss. On 24 April 2016, El Monir played full 90 minutes with providing two assists in a 3–3 away draw against BATE Borisov.

Partizan
After a year and a half playing in Belarus, when his contract with Dinamo Minsk, El Monir among several options decided to return to Serbia, only that this time, to join the power-house Partizan. He had been on Partizan's agenda on several occasions in the past and the move finally materialised. On 16 January 2017, he signed with Partizan a three-year contract. He made his club debut on 13 April 2017 in a 3–1 away win against Novi Pazar.

Orlando City
On 27 December 2017, El Monir signed with Orlando City SC in Major League Soccer. He made his debut on March 4 in Orlando's season opener at home to DC United, a 1–1 draw.

Los Angeles FC
On 11 December 2018, El Monir was traded by Orlando to Los Angeles FC in exchange for João Moutinho.

Al-Ittihad Tripoli
On 6 April 2021, El Monir returned to Al-Ittihad Tripoli for a third spell.

International career
Mohamed El Monir made the squad for the 2012 Africa Cup of Nations, but was an unused substitute at all the matches at the tournament. Subsequently, he was part of the Libyan squad in the following call by Marcos Paquetá for the 2014 FIFA World Cup qualifiers against Togo and Cameroon, played on 3 and 10 June respectively. He finally made his debut appearance for Libya on 14 October 2012 in his country's 2–0 loss to Algeria.

Career statistics

International goals
As of match played 11 November 2016.

Honours
Jagodina
Serbian Cup: 2012–13
Partizan
Serbian SuperLiga: 2016–17
Serbian Cup: 2016–17
Los Angeles FC
Supporters' Shield: 2019
Al-Ittihad Tripoli
Libyan Premier League: 2020–21

References

External links
 Profile and photo at FK Jagodina official website 
 
 

1992 births
Living people
People from Tripoli, Libya
Libyan footballers
Association football fullbacks
Association football wingers
Libya international footballers
2012 Africa Cup of Nations players
Association football midfielders
Al-Ittihad Club (Tripoli) players
FK Jagodina players
FK Partizan players
FC Dinamo Minsk players
Serbian SuperLiga players
Expatriate footballers in Serbia
Expatriate footballers in Belarus
Orlando City SC players
Los Angeles FC players
Major League Soccer players
Expatriate soccer players in the United States
Belarusian Premier League players
Libyan Premier League players
Libyan expatriate sportspeople in the United States
Libyan expatriate sportspeople in Belarus
Libyan expatriate sportspeople in Serbia
Libya A' international footballers
2022 African Nations Championship players